is a retired Japanese badminton player who affiliate with Hokuto Bank. She was the women's doubles bronze medalist at the 2018 World Championships, and the silver medalist at the 2013 East Asian Games. She won the year-end tournament Superseries Finals in 2017. Yonemoto was part of Japanese winning team at the 2017 Asia Mixed Team Championships, 2018 Uber Cup, 2018 Asian Games, and at the 2018 Asia Women's Team Championships.

Career 
Yonemoto won the 2011 New Zealand and Austrian International tournament partnered with Yuriko Miki. They also won the Grand Prix title at the 2014 Russia Open tournament.

Yonemoto announced her retirement from the badminton tournament at the press conference in the Akita Prefectural office on 29 January 2021, though she was apparently still involved in badminton as a commentator.

Achievements

BWF World Championships 
Women's doubles

East Asian Games 
Women's doubles

BWF World Tour (1 title, 1 runner-up) 
The BWF World Tour, which was announced on 19 March 2017 and implemented in 2018, is a series of elite badminton tournaments sanctioned by the Badminton World Federation (BWF). The BWF World Tours are divided into levels of World Tour Finals, Super 1000, Super 750, Super 500, Super 300 (part of the HSBC World Tour), and the BWF Tour Super 100.

Women's doubles

BWF Superseries 
The BWF Superseries, which was launched on 14 December 2006 and implemented in 2007, was a series of elite badminton tournaments, sanctioned by the Badminton World Federation (BWF). BWF Superseries levels were Superseries and Superseries Premier. A season of Superseries consisted of twelve tournaments around the world that had been introduced since 2011. Successful players were invited to the Superseries Finals, which were held at the end of each year.

Women's doubles

  BWF Superseries Finals tournament
  BWF Superseries Premier tournament
  BWF Superseries tournament

BWF Grand Prix 
The BWF Grand Prix had two levels, the Grand Prix and Grand Prix Gold. It was a series of badminton tournaments sanctioned by the Badminton World Federation (BWF) and played between 2007 and 2017.

Women's doubles

Mixed doubles

  BWF Grand Prix Gold tournament
  BWF Grand Prix tournament

BWF International Challenge/Series 
Women's doubles

Mixed doubles

  BWF International Challenge tournament
  BWF International Series tournament
  BWF Future Series tournament

References

External links 

 

1990 births
Living people
Sportspeople from Hiroshima
Japanese female badminton players
Badminton players at the 2018 Asian Games
Asian Games gold medalists for Japan
Asian Games medalists in badminton
Medalists at the 2018 Asian Games